Ruslan Kurbanov (born 17 September 1991) is a Kazakhstani épée fencer, who earned a silver medal in the  individual event at the 2013 Summer Universiade and a bronze medal in the team event. The same year, he became champion of Kazakhstan after defeating Asian champion Elmir Alimzhanov.

His ex-wife Tamara Pochekutova is a sabre fencer. They have one son, born in 2013. Kurbanov is from Tatar descent.

References

1991 births
Living people
Tatar sportspeople
Kazakhstani people of Tatar descent
Sportspeople from Oskemen
Kazakhstani male épée fencers
Fencers at the 2014 Asian Games
Fencers at the 2018 Asian Games
Asian Games bronze medalists for Kazakhstan
Asian Games medalists in fencing
Medalists at the 2014 Asian Games
Medalists at the 2018 Asian Games
Universiade medalists in fencing
Universiade silver medalists for Kazakhstan
Medalists at the 2013 Summer Universiade
Fencers at the 2020 Summer Olympics
Olympic fencers of Kazakhstan